Evanger Station is a railway station located on the Bergensbanen railway line in the village of Evanger in Voss municipality, Vestland county, Norway. The station is served by twelve daily departures per direction by the Bergen Commuter Rail operated by Vy Tog. The station opened as part of Vossebanen in 1883.

External links
 Jernbaneverket's page on Evanger

Railway stations in Voss
Railway stations on Bergensbanen
Railway stations opened in 1883